Kim Min-jae (Hangul: 김민재) also known as Real.be, is a South Korean actor and rapper. He starred in television series Second 20s (2015), My First Time (2015), Dr. Romantic (2016), Guardian: The Lonely and Great God (2016), Tempted (2018), Flower Crew: Joseon Marriage Agency (2019), Dr. Romantic 2 (2020),  Do You Like Brahms? (2020), Dali & Cocky Prince (2021), and Poong, the Joseon Psychiatrist (2022). He was also a contestant in the rap competition Show Me the Money 4 in 2015.

Early life and education
Kim studied composition and piano-playing at a music academy in middle school. Kim then auditioned for CJ E&M and became a first generation trainee of the company for four years from his first year of high school, at Seoul Performing Arts High School (SOPA).

Since March 2016, Kim attends Chung-Ang University.

Career

2014–2015: Debut and Show Me the Money 4
Kim was featured in music stages of CJ E&M artists as a rapper since 2014 and was one of the first generation of trainees from CJ E&M.
Kim debuted as an actor in 2014 in a joint South Korean-Vietnamese drama Forever Young. He also had a cameo role in the tvN drama I Need Romance 3 (2014) as an idol singer preparing for debut.

While he was preparing for his debut as an idol singer, he was cast in Mnet's drama Perseverance Goo Hae-ra in 2015 after going through several auditions.
Kim then made a cameo appearance in KBS2's drama The Producers as one of 2 Days & 1 Night – Season 5 cast members. In June the same year, Kim joined the rap competition Show Me the Money 4 as a contestant.

Kim was then cast in supporting roles in the dramas Second 20s (2015) and My First Time (2015). Kim also featured in the singles "Our Feeling" for the OST of My First Time with Park So-dam and Lee Yi-kyung, and "Star" for the OST of Second 20s with Mamamoo's Solar.

On November 21, 2015, Kim, alongside Kim Sae-ron, started hosting MBC's music program Show! Music Core. They left the show in September 2016.

2016–present: Rising popularity
In 2016, Kim featured in MBC's family drama My Little Baby. Kim then featured in the medical drama Dr. Romantic and received a New Star award for his role at the SBS Drama Awards. He also made a special appearance in tvN's hit fantasy drama Guardian: The Lonely and Great God (2016), which garnered him increased recognition.

In 2017, Kim starred in KBS2' variety drama Hit the Top. 
The same year, Kim was cast in the film Love+Sling which marked his big screen debut. He was also cast in Feng Shui, the third installment of the "divining art trilogy" by Han Jae-rim.

In 2018, Kim was cast to play a wealthy playboy in MBC's romance thriller Tempted.

In 2019, Kim starred in the youth historical drama Flower Crew: Joseon Marriage Agency which marked his first leading role. In June, Kim signed up with a new agency YamYam Entertainment.

In 2020, Kim reprised his role of Park Eun-tak in Dr. Romantic 2.
The same year he starred in SBS drama Do You Like Brahms?, playing Park Joon-young, a world-renowned pianist for which he received Excellence Award, Actor in a Miniseries Fantasy/Romance Drama and Best Couple Award with Park Eun-bin at 2020 SBS Drama Awards.

In 2021, Kim participated in composing the lyrics of "I'm Jealous" on his label mate Punch's second mini album FULL BLOOM. Later that year, Kim starred in the drama Dali & Cocky Prince, which premiered in September on KBS2. He played the role of Jin Moo-hak, rich young man who has little education and no background but knows to make money for which he received Excellence Award, Actor in a Miniseries at 2021 KBS Drama Awards.

In 2022, Kim played the titular Yoo Se-poong in the tvN historical medical drama Poong, the Joseon Psychiatrist.

Personal life

Military service 
In February 2023, Kim told the media that he plans to enlist in the mandatory military service this year or in 2024.

Filmography

Film

Television series

Television show

Hosting

Music video appearances

Discography

Singles

Songwriting credits

Awards and nominations

References

External links 

 
 
 
 

1996 births
21st-century South Korean male actors
South Korean male child actors
South Korean male rappers
South Korean male television actors
Living people
People from Daegu
South Korean male film actors
South Korean male web series actors
School of Performing Arts Seoul alumni
Chung-Ang University alumni